The papal conclave held from 13 to 20 December 1334 elected Jacques Fournier to succeed John XXII as pope. Fournier took the name Benedict XII.

Cardinals
Twenty-four cardinals attended the conclave of December 1334. Their names are listed by Konrad Eubel in Hierarchia catholica.

Politics
An early favorite among the papabile was Cardinal Jean-Raymond de Comminges, Bishop of Porto e Santa Rufina, son of Count Bernard VI of Comminges and Laura de Montfort. The French cardinals, led by Elie de Talleyrand-Périgord, did not want to leave their native France for the plague-infested and unfriendly city of Rome. And since the Orsini faction wanted to return to Rome, the Colonna faction chose the opposite and joined the French. A sufficient number of cardinals agreed to support him (2/3, or a minimum of 16 in number). Thus he could have been elected Pope had he been willing to swear to a condition not to return the papacy to Rome. Understandably, he refused his consent to the election on those terms.

The Cistercian cardinal, Jacques Fournier, was elected on the evening of 20 December 1334, after Vespers, on the eighth day of the conclave.

According to the Catholic Encyclopedia:

Notes

Books and articles
 Ameri, Gianluca and Clario Di Fabio, Luca Fieschi: cardinale, collezionista, mecenate, 1300-1336 (Cinisello Balsamo (Milano) : Silvana, 2011).
 Baluzius, Stephanus [Étienne Baluze], Vitae Paparum Avinionensium 2 volumes (Paris: apud Franciscum Muguet 1693). (in Latin) "Secunda Vita Benedicti XII," 213-220. "Tertia Vita Benedicti XII," 219-225. "Quarta Vita Benedicti XII," 225-228. "Quinta Vita Benedicti XII," 229-244.
 (second edition 1913).
 Bernardus Guidonis, "Vita Joannis Papae XXII," in Ludovicus Antonius Muratori, Rerum Italicarum Scriptores Tomus Tertius (Milan 1723), 673-684. (in Latin)
 Dragomanni, Francesco Gherardi (editor), Cronica di Giovanni Villani Tomo III (Firenze: Sansoni 1845). 
 Duhamel, L. "Un neveu de Jean XXII, Le cardinal Arnaud de Via," Bulletin monumental 5 serie, Tome 11 (Paris 1883) 401-421. 
 
 Souchon, Martin. Die Papstwahlen von Bonifaz VIII bis Urban VI (Braunschweig: Benno Goeritz 1888).
 Theiner, Augustinus (Editor), Caesaris S. R. E. Cardinalis Baronii, Od. Raynaldi et Jac. Laderchii Annales Ecclesiastici Tomus Vigesimus Quartus 1313-1333 (Barri-Ducis: Ludovicus Guerin 1872); Tomus Vigesimus Quintus 1334-1355 (Barri-Ducis: Ludovicus Guerin 1872). (in Latin)
Trollope, Thomas Adolphus. 1876. The Papal Conclaves, as they were and as they are.

External links
 Adams, J. P, Sede Vacante and Conclave of 1334. Retrieved: 2016-06-26.
 Guillemain, Bernard. "Benedetto XII," Dizionario dei Papi (2000). (in Italian)

Papal conclaves
14th-century elections
1334
Avignon Papacy